Stanford Elmer "Stan" Parris (September 9, 1929 – March 27, 2010) was an American lawyer and Republican politician. He represented Virginia's 8th congressional district in the United States House of Representatives for six two year terms. He served in the Fairfax County Board of Supervisors, Virginia House of Delegates, and also as Virginia Secretary of the Commonwealth. He served in the United States Air Force during the Korean War, earning several medals.

Early life 
Parris was born in Champaign, Illinois and educated in the public schools there.  He earned a B.S. at University of Illinois (1950), and an LL.B. at the George Washington University (1958) while working as a doorkeeper at the United States Senate. He was a U.S. Air Force F-84 Thunderjet jet fighter aircraft pilot in the Korean War, and was shot down once and rescued. His military decorations include the Distinguished Flying Cross with cluster, Air Medal with clusters, Purple Heart, Presidential Unit Citation (Korea), and Presidential Unit Citation (United States). Following his discharge from the military, Parris worked briefly as an airline pilot, before starting law school. He was admitted to the bar in 1958, and set up a private law practice in Alexandria, Virginia. Parris was president of a Chrysler dealership in Woodbridge, Virginia and the Flying Circus Aerodrome, an air show.

Politics 

Parris was elected to the Fairfax County Board of Supervisors and served one term (1964–1967). In 1969, he was elected to the Virginia House of Delegates and served from April 11, 1969, to November 21, 1972. During that time he made a controversial comment when he joked that the 14th Street Bridge between Virginia and Washington, DC was the "longest in the world" because it "stretches from Northern Virginia to Africa." Nonetheless, he was elected in 1972 to the United States House of Representatives, but lost his 1974 reelection bid to Democrat Herb Harris in the post-Watergate scandal.   However, in the 1980 House elections, he defeated Harris by 1,090 votes. He sought his party's nomination for the 1985 election of Governor of Virginia, but withdrew in May. In 1989, Parris again ran for Governor of Virginia. He lost in the Republican primary to former Attorney General Marshall Coleman and former United States Senator Paul S. Trible. He also served a term as Virginia Secretary of the Commonwealth in the late 1970s.

In the 93rd Congress, Parris was a member of the House Committee on Science and Technology, its subcommittees on Aeronautics and Space Technology, Science, Research, and Development and Energy. Economic woes and a federal budget stalemate contributed to his 1990 election loss to then Alexandria mayor James P. Moran Jr. Parris was also known for introducing a bill during his first term which prohibited the National Football League from imposing television blackouts of non-sold-out games. His position as the ranking Republican member of the House District Committee often put him at odds with the city government of the District of Columbia, and resulted in frequent quarreling with the mayor, Marion Barry.

Parris thought about running for the United States Senate in 1982 after Harry F. Byrd Jr. retired, but opted to run for reelection to the House after Harris sought to regain his old seat.  He defeated Harris by 1,600 votes, spending $700,000 in Virginia's most expensive congressional campaign up to that point.  He defeated State Senator Dick Saslaw with somewhat less difficulty in 1984, and easily defeated underfunded Democrats in 1986 and 1988.  However, in 1990, he lost to Alexandria mayor Jim Moran by seven points in what is still considered an upset. During the campaign, Parris, referring to the issue of the Gulf War, said, "The only three people I know who support Saddam Hussein's position are Moammar Gadhafi, Yasser Arafat, and Jim Moran." Moran angrily responded by saying that Parris was "a deceitful, fatuous jerk", and that he wanted "to break his nose". Moran's well-financed campaign also focused on Parris' opposition to abortion. Moran upset Parris, winning by 7.1 percent.

President George H. W. Bush appointed him to a seven-year term as President of the Saint Lawrence Seaway Development Corporation in 1991, weeks after he left Congress. He resigned four years later to run for a seat in the Virginia Senate. His primary residence after leaving Congress was in Melbourne, Florida; but he also owned property in Mathews County, Virginia.

Death
Stanford Parris died from heart disease on March 27, 2010, at his home in Mathews County in eastern Virginia. He was buried at Arlington National Cemetery.

Upon the death of Parris, Virginia Governor Bob McDonnell said in a statement that Parris "played major leadership roles" in endeavors as varied as the establishment of the Torpedo Factory Art Center in Old Town Alexandria to flood control and closing the District of Columbia's former Lorton Reformatory in Fairfax County, and that "He used his time on this Earth to help others, and to effectively advance the ideas and principles in which he believed."

Electoral history

! Year
!
! Subject
! Party
! Votes
! %
!
! Opponent
! Party
! Votes
! %
!
! Opponent
! Party
! Votes
! %
!
|-
|1972
||
| |Stanford Parris
| |Republican
| |60,446
| |44.4
|
| |Robert F. Horan
| |Democratic
| |51,444
| |37.7
|
| |William Durland
| |Independent
| |18,654
| |13.7
|colspan=5|
|-
|1974
||
| |Stanford Parris
| |Republican
| |38,997
| |42.3
|
| |Herbert E. Harris
| |Democratic
| |53,074
| |57.6
|
|colspan=5|
|-
|1980
||
| |Stanford Parris
| |Republican
| |95,624
| |48.8
|
| |Herbert E. Harris
| |Democratic
| |94,530
| |48.2
|
| |Deborah Frantz
| |Independent
| |5,729
| |3.0
|colspan=5|
|-
|1982
||
| |Stanford Parris
| |Republican
| |69,620
| |49.7
|
| |Herbert E. Harris
| |Democratic
| |68,071
| |48.5
|
| |Austin W. Morrill
| |Independent
| |2,373
| |1.6
|colspan=5|
|-
|1984
||
| |Stanford Parris
| |Republican
| |125,015
| |55.7
|
| |Richard L. Saslaw
| |Democratic
| |97,250
| |43.3
|
| |Donald Carpenter
| |Independent
| |1,814
| |0.8
|colspan=5|
|-
|1986
||
| |Stanford Parris
| |Republican
| |72,670
| |61.7
|
| | James H. Boren
| |Democratic
| |44,965
| |38.2
|
|colspan=5|
|-
|1988
||
| |Stanford Parris
| |Republican
| |154,761
| |62.3
|
| |David G. Brickley
| |Democratic
| |93,561
| |37.6
|
|colspan=5|
|-
|1990
||
| |Stanford Parris
| |Republican
| |76,367
| |44.6
|
| |James Moran
| |Democratic
| |88,745
| |51.7
|
| |Robert T. Murphy
| |Independent
| |5,958
| |3.5
|colspan=5|

References

External links

 Lobbyist Profile
 Obituary from the Washington Post
 Stanford Parris Papers 1964-1987

1929 births
2010 deaths
20th-century American politicians
American Episcopalians
American automobile salespeople
American lobbyists
United States Air Force personnel of the Korean War
Republican Party members of the Virginia House of Delegates
Politicians from Alexandria, Virginia
People from Champaign, Illinois
Recipients of the Distinguished Flying Cross (United States)
United States Air Force officers
University of Illinois Urbana-Champaign alumni
Secretaries of the Commonwealth of Virginia
Businesspeople from Alexandria, Virginia
Virginia lawyers
Members of the Fairfax County Board of Supervisors
Recipients of the Air Medal
Burials at Arlington National Cemetery
Republican Party members of the United States House of Representatives from Virginia
George Washington University Law School alumni
Commercial aviators
Lawyers from Alexandria, Virginia
Members of Congress who became lobbyists